John McNicholl is a country singer from Northern Ireland.

McNicholl's first album, Something Old, Something New was released in 2004 and earned him the "Best Newcomer" award at the Irish World Awards. He also represented Ireland at the CMA Global Showcase in Nashville. Since then, he has gone on to record a number of albums each earning him a following in both Ireland and the United Kingdom.

Early life
He was born in Foreglen, a small village in Derry.

Discography
Something Old, Something New
What's A Guy Gotta Do
The Irish Collection
You Are No Angel
Someone Like You
It's Your Love

References

Living people
Irish country singers
Irish male singers
Musicians from Derry (city)
Year of birth missing (living people)